Jackson Ferreira Silvério (born 12 April 1991), commonly known as Jackson, is a Brazilian footballer who currently plays as a left-back for Teuta.

Career statistics

Club

Notes

Honours

Club

Teuta Durrës

Albanian Superliga: 2020–21
Albanian Supercup: 2021

References

External links
Jackson at Kicker

1991 births
Living people
Brazilian footballers
Brazilian expatriate footballers
Association football defenders
Associação Desportiva São Caetano players
São Bernardo Futebol Clube players
Sport Club do Recife players
Grêmio Foot-Ball Porto Alegrense players
Clube Atlético do Porto players
Boa Esporte Clube players
Kallithea F.C. players
Trikala F.C. players
Luftëtari Gjirokastër players
SC Gjilani players
Campeonato Brasileiro Série B players
Football League (Greece) players
Kategoria Superiore players
Brazilian expatriate sportspeople in Greece
Expatriate footballers in Greece
Brazilian expatriate sportspeople in Albania
Expatriate footballers in Albania
Expatriate footballers in Kosovo
Sportspeople from Recife